Cueto is a municipality and town in the Holguín Province of Cuba.

Geography
The municipality is located southwest of its province, next to the border with Santiago de Cuba Province. It borders with the municipalities of Báguanos, Mayarí, Mella and Urbano Noris (San Germán). In addition to Cueto itself, the municipal territory includes the villages of Alto Cedro, Barajagua, Birán, Marcané, and other minor localities.

Birán, best known as the birthplace of Fidel, Raúl and Ramón Castro, was part of the neighboring municipality of Mayarí until the 1976 reform.

Demographics
The town of Cueto, as of the 2017 census, had a registered population of 15,111 living in just over 11,000 homes.

Popular culture
The name of the town, along with its municipal villages of Alto Cedro and Marcané, figures in the song "Chan Chan" composed in 1984 and released in 1996 ("De Alto Cedro voy para Marcané, llego a Cueto voy para Mayarí") by Compay Segundo, and in his song from the Buena Vista Social Club.

The same line is repeated in a chorus of the 2011 song "Buena" song by a Polish band Blue Cafe.

See also
List of cities in Cuba

References

External links

 Cueto, Cuba

Populated places in Holguín Province